The Chilean angelshark (Squatina armata) is an angelshark of the family Squatinidae found in the subtropical waters of Chile, that grows up to  in length. The holotype is lost. Reproduction is ovoviviparous.

Diet
The Chilean Armata mainly consumes lizardfish, teleosts and their remains, crustaceans, mollusks, elasmobranchs, and some species of shrimp. The species can be labeled as a selective, piscivorous, and carcinophagus predator.  They were also found to be specialist predators, meaning that they only feed on limited prey types and in specific environments.

References

External links

 
 Compagno, Dando, & Fowler, Sharks of the World, Princeton University Press, New Jersey 2005 

Chilean angelshark
Fish of Chile
Western South American coastal fauna
Chilean angelshark